Richard Tuggle (born 8 August 1948) is an American film director and writer best known as the writer of Escape from Alcatraz, the writer and director of Tightrope, and the director of Out of Bounds.

References

External links

1948 births
American male screenwriters
Living people
Writers from Coral Gables, Florida
Film directors from Florida
Screenwriters from Florida